The ceremonial county of Wiltshire, England, (which includes the unitary authority of Swindon), is divided into seven Parliamentary constituencies. They are all County constituencies.

Constituencies

2010 boundary changes
Under the Fifth Periodic Review of Westminster constituencies, the Boundary Commission for England decided to increase the number of seats in Wiltshire from 6 to 7, with the re-establishment of Chippenham, which impacted on neighbouring constituencies. An adjusted Westbury constituency was renamed South West Wiltshire.

Proposed boundary changes 
See 2023 Periodic Review of Westminster constituencies for further details.

Following the abandonment of the Sixth Periodic Review (the 2018 review), the Boundary Commission for England formally launched the 2023 Review on 5 January 2021. Initial proposals were published on 8 June 2021 and, following two periods of public consultation, revised proposals were published on 8 November 2022. Final proposals will be published by 1 July 2023.

The commission has proposed that Wiltshire be combined with Gloucestershire as a sub-region of the South West Region, with the creation of the cross-county boundary constituency of South Cotswolds, resulting in a major reconfiguration of Chippenham. Devizes and North Wiltshire would be abolished and new constituencies named East Wiltshire, and Melksham and Devizes, created. The following seats are proposed:

Containing electoral wards in Swindon

 East Wiltshire (part)
 Swindon North
 Swindon South

Containing electoral wards in Wiltshire (unitary authority)

 Chippenham
 East Wiltshire (part)
 Melksham and Devizes
 Salisbury
 South Cotswolds (parts also in the Districts of Cotswold and Stroud in Gloucestershire)
 South West Wiltshire

Results history
Primary data source: House of Commons research briefing - General election results from 1918 to 2019

2019 
The number of votes cast for each political party who fielded candidates in constituencies comprising Wiltshire in the 2019 general election were as follows:

Percentage votes 

1pre-1979 - Liberal Party; 1983 & 1987 - SDP-Liberal Alliance

* Included in Other

Seats 

11974 & 1979 - Liberal Party; 1983 & 1987 - SDP-Liberal Alliance

Maps

Historical representation by party
A cell marked → (with a different colour background to the preceding cell) indicates that the previous MP continued to sit under a new party name.

1885 to 1918

1918 to 1974

1974 to present

See also
 List of constituencies in South West England

Notes

References

1. https://www.bbc.co.uk/news/politics/constituencies
2.http://geo.digiminster.com/election/2015-05-07/Search?Query=wiltshire

Wiltshire
 Wiltshire
 
Parliamentary